Two battles in Japanese history were named Battle of Azukizaka:

 Battle of Azukizaka (1542) between Oda Nobuhide's forces and those of Imagawa Yoshimoto
 Battle of Azukizaka (1564) between the Ikkō-ikki and the samurai of Tokugawa Ieyasu